Bala perdida is a 2001 Peruvian surrealist crime drama film directed by Aldo Salvini (in his directorial debut) and written by Salvini, Luis Felipe Alvarado and Alfonso Pareja. Starring Rodrigo Sánchez Patiño, Pablo Saldarriaga, Daniela Sarfati, Monserrat Brugué, Ramsay Ross and Aristóteles Picho. It is based on the book Noche de cuervos by Raúl Tola. It premiered on October 4, 2001, in Peruvian theaters.

Synopsis 
X arrives with his friends in Cusco. The idea is to have a good time during the days of your stay in that magical city and that has the characteristics of the cities of southern Peru (that mixture of mystery and suspense in its streets). A guy Charly paints the other side of the city for him, X is willing to try everything, as long as he is only a few days in Cusco, he has to make the most of it. An unexpected ending can occur.

Cast 
The actors participating in this film are:

 Rodrigo Sánchez Patiño as X
 Aristóteles Picho as Charlie
 Pablo Saldarriaga as Rafa
 Daniela Sarfati as Pamela
 Ramsay Ross as Timothy
 Nicolás Galindo as Cirrosis
 Alberto Ísola as Brothel drunk
 Monserrat Brugué como Giovanna
 Gianfranco Brero as X's father
 Melania Urbina as Prostitute
 Norma Martínez
 Salvador del Solar
 Gabriel Calvo

References

External links 

 

2001 films
2001 crime drama films
Surrealist films
Peruvian crime drama films
2000s Spanish-language films
2000s Peruvian films
Films set in Peru
Films shot in Peru
Films about racism
2001 directorial debut films